Zhongshan West railway station is a railway station in Zhongshan County, Hezhou, Guangxi, China. It is an intermediate station on the Guiyang–Guangzhou high-speed railway and was opened on 3 April 2015.

References

External links

Railway stations in China opened in 2015
Railway stations in Guangxi